Adolfo Armando Uriona F.D.P. (May 27, 1955) is a prelate of the Roman Catholic Church. He served as bishop of Añatuya from 2004 to 2014.

Life 
Born in Mar del Plata, Uriona became a member of the Sons of Divine Providence on March 8, 1979. He was ordained to the priesthood on June 28, 1980.

On March 4, 2004, he was appointed bishop of Añatuya. Uriona received his episcopal consecration on the following May 8 from Jorge Mario Bergoglio, archbishop of Buenos Aires, the later pope Francis, with bishop of Lomas de Zamora, Agustín Roberto Radrizzani, and bishop of Santa María del Patrocinio en Buenos Aires, Miguel Mykycej, serving as co-consecrators.

External links 
 catholic-hierarchy.org, Bishop Adolfo Armando Uriona

1955 births
Living people
People from Mar del Plata
21st-century Roman Catholic bishops in Argentina
Sons of Divine Providence
Roman Catholic bishops of Villa de la Concepción del Río Cuarto
Roman Catholic bishops of Añatuya